Indore G.P.O. commonly known as G.P.O. or G.P.O. colony is a residential locality within the largest city and commercial hub Indore, Madhya Pradesh, India. The area is named after the main General Post Office of the Indore City.

Postal Code: 452001

Elected Member of the Legislative Assembly:Indira Verma

Outlook

G.P.O. is known for its General Post Office and a  mosque opposite to G.P.O. building.

Locality
A lot of society are blooming up here along with hotels and motels. There are more than 6 sectors which houses 50 houses each

Getting there

Bus routes:
The Dewas–Pithampur bus service by pass whole Indore connects G.P.O. Besides this, many city bus service connects it to other localities of Indore.

001-Panchwati–Tejaji Nagar
002-
025-

Suburbs of Indore
Neighbourhoods in Indore